Keepingia is a genus of sea snails, marine gastropod mollusks in the subfamily Dorsaninae  of the family Nassariidae, the Nassa mud snails or dog whelks.

Species
 † Keepingia gossardii (Nyst, 1836) 
 † Keepingia laevis Lozouet, 1999

References

 Nuttall C.P. & Cooper J. (1973). A review of some English Paleogene Nassariidae, formerly referred to Cominella. Bulletin of the British Museum (Natural History), Geology. 23(3): 179–219.
 Lozouet, P., 1999. Nouvelles espèces de gastéropodes (Mollusca: Gastropoda) de l'Oligocène et du Miocène inférieur d'Aquitaine (sud-ouest de la France). Partie 2. Cossmanniana 6(1-2): 1-68
 Lozouet P. & Galindo L.A. (2015). Resolution of the confused classification of some Miocene Nassariidae, and reappraisal of their paleobiodiversity on the French Atlantic seaboard. Archiv für Molluskenkunde. 144(1): 31-50

External links
 

Nassariidae